Martin Roe (born 1 April 1992) is a Norwegian athlete, specializing in combined events (decathlon and heptathlon). On April 26, 2018, he broke the Norwegian record with 8228 points, in the combined events meet in Firenze. In 2017, he won the men's heptathlon competition at the Norwegian Indoor Championships in Sandnes, Norway, with a new personal record of 5,690, beating six personal bests in the process. On July 2, he achieved a new outdoor personal record of 8,144 points in the decathlon – his first time crossing the barrier of 8,000 points – to deliver a win for Norway at a European Combined Events Team Championships Second League event taking place in Monzón, Spain. In August, he represented his country at the 2017 World Championships, finishing twelfth with 8,040 points.

Personal life
A native of Bergen, he has a younger sister, Matilde (born October 9, 1996), who is a shot put specialist. Their mother, Ingunn Gatland Jacobsen, is their coach.

International competitions

Personal bests

Outdoor

Indoor

References

External links 

 
 
 
 Martin Roe at Norwegian Athletics Association 
 Martin Roe at Decathlon 2000
 
 
 

1992 births
Living people
Sportspeople from Bergen
Norwegian decathletes
World Athletics Championships athletes for Norway
Athletes (track and field) at the 2020 Summer Olympics
Olympic athletes of Norway